State Route 90 (SR 90) is part of Maine's system of numbered state highways, located in Knox County.  It is a minor highway serving as a bypass of Rockland on U.S. Route 1 (US 1), which it connects to at both ends.

Route description
SR 90 begins at US 1 in Warren.  The route runs eastward, crossing SR 131 on its way out of town.  SR 90 continues northeast across the northwestern corner of Rockland into the town of Rockport where it crosses SR 17 and meets its eastern end at US 1.

History

Major intersections

See also

References

External links

Floodgap Roadgap's RoadsAroundME: Maine State Route 90

090
Transportation in Knox County, Maine